Peadar O'Loughlin  (6 November 1929 – 22 October 2017) was an Irish fluter, fiddler, and piper from Kilmaley County Clare, Ireland who had been a fixture in Irish music since the late 1940s and was best known for having played on the highly influential 1959 LP "All-Ireland Champions - Violin" (with Paddy Canny, P. Joe Hayes, and Bridie Lafferty), which was one of the first LPs of Irish traditional music. He performed in the Tulla Céilí Band and Kilfenora Céilí Band and recorded duet albums with piper Ronan Browne and fiddler Maeve Donnelly.

His unique flute style earned him All-Ireland champion titles in 1956 and 1957. It is characterized by strong rhythmic flow with sparse ornamentation, occasionally punctuated by unusually long silences which emphasize the rhythmic structure of the tunes.

Discography
 All-Ireland Champions - Violin, 1959
 The South West Wind (with Ronan Browne), 1988
 Touch Me If You Dare (with Ronan Browne), 2002
 The Thing Itself (with Maeve Donnelly), 2004
 The Legacy (with Ronan Browne), 2015
Peter O'Loughlin, A Musical Life, 2016
Friends of Note (with Paddy Canny, Paddy Murphy & Geraldine Cotter), 2019

External links 
 mustrad.org page about "All-Ireland Champions - Violin"
 Irish language television music awards - 2005 Hall of Fame

Musicians from County Clare
2017 deaths
Irish flautists
1929 births
Claddagh Records artists